Rocket Girl or Girls in plural may refer to:

 Rise of the Rocket Girls: The Women Who Propelled Us, from Missiles to the Moon to Mars, a book by Nathalia Holt on women who did computations for JPL in its early days. 
 Rocket Girl, London-based independent record label
 Rocket Girl, 2011 song  by South Korean band Stellar
 Rocket Girl, 2013 comic book series.
 Rocket Girl a play and a biography about Mary Sherman Morgan
 Rocket Girl (Doc Walker song), song by Canadian band Doc Walker from their 2001 album Curve
 Rocket Girls, Japanese light novel written by Hōsuke Nojiri
 Rocket Girls (band), a Chinese girl group